Cratylia is a genus of legume in the family Fabaceae. 
It contains the following species:
 Cratylia argentea
 Cratylia bahiensis
 Cratylia hypargyraea
 Cratylia mollis

References

External links

Phaseoleae
Fabaceae genera
Taxonomy articles created by Polbot